Kingsbridge railway station can refer to:

 Dublin Heuston railway station in Ireland, formerly known as Kingsbridge station
 Kingsbridge railway station (England), closed station in Kingsbridge, Devon
 Kings Bridge (NYC station), on the Hudson Line in the Bronx, New York, United States